The Royal Society of Biology (RSB), previously called the Society of Biology, is a learned society and professional association in the United Kingdom created to advance the interests of biology in academia, industry, education, and research. Formed in 2009 by the merger of the Biosciences Federation and the Institute of Biology, the society has around 18,000 individual members, and more than 100 member organisations. In addition to engaging the public on matters related to the life sciences, the society seeks to develop the profession and to guide the development of related policies.

Organisation
In May 2015, the society, previously called the Society of Biology, was granted permission to become the "Royal Society of Biology". The society is also a registered charity.

The first president of the society was Nancy Rothwell (University of Manchester); the current president is Julia Goodfellow. 

The society has six Special Interest Groups: the Animal Science Group, UK Biology Competitions, Natural Capital Initiative, the UK Plant Sciences Federation, Biology Education Research Group and Heads of University Biosciences.

The Royal Society of Biology supports university students and early-career researchers with careers advice, travel grants and Life Sciences Careers Conferences. In 2012 it developed a Degree Accreditation Programme to promote high standards in the biosciences and highlight degrees which provide graduates with the skills required for academic and industry careers.

Professional Qualifications
Members of the society are entitled to employ postnominal letters: AMRSB for associates, MRSB for members, and FRSB for fellows.

The society is a member of the Science Council, and is licensed to award the professional qualifications of Chartered Scientist (CSci), Registered Scientist (RSci), and Registered Science Technician (RSciTech) status to suitably qualified members. The society can also confer the status of Chartered Science Teacher (CSciTeach).

The original professional qualification of the society is Charted Biologist, which can only be conferred by the Royal Society of Biology. The title "Chartered Biologist" is legally protected in the UK, and Chartered Biologists have the exclusive entitlement to use the designation CBiol after their names.

Unlike academic qualifications such as a BSc (which indicate a level of training) Chartered status confirms both an academic level of training combined with a period of professional work experience. It therefore indicates a level of competence combined with practical experience.

The title of Chartered Biologist was originally designated with permission of the Privy Council to appropriately qualified members of the Institute of Biology (the original precursor body to the Royal Society of Biology) in July 1984.  According to the Privy Council CBiol "provides evidence that a biologist's professional qualifications and experience have been approved by his peers and is a definite measure of knowledge and ability." The right for the Institute of Biology to confer CBiol was incorporated into the Institute's Royal Charter.  On 7 October 2009, this right was transferred by the final meeting of the former Institute of Biology Council to the newly formed Society of Biology; that meeting was also the first Society of Biology's Council meeting.  Subsequently, in May 2015, this once more transferred to the Royal Society of Biology when the Society of Biology was rebranded.

The status of Chartered Biologist today is conferred upon both Fellows and Members of the Royal Society of Biology. The conditions for qualification are a university degree-level qualification (or equivalent) in biology or a related bioscience in addition to either (a) two years of training in their programme of continuing professional development, or (b) substantial professional experience over 10 years.

CBiol has European recognition. In 1983, the Institute of Biology's General Secretary, Philp O'Donoghue FIBiol, in preparing to submit the original proposals for Chartered Biologist to the Privy Council, chaired the first meeting of the European Communities Biological Association (an umbrella body for biologists' professional bodies within the European Economic Communities that preceded the European Union). At that meeting Paolo Fasella, the then European Community Directorate-General XII responsible for coordinating science research across Europe, helped pave the way for eventually enhancing the status of Chartered Biologist in the European Union.  This took place on 4 January 1991 under EC Directive 89/48 when the 'single market' came into effect: the directive harmonised member nations' professional qualifications. The Chartered Biologist designation is today covered by Directive 2005/36/EC, of the European Parliament and of the Council, of 7 September 2005. This directive establishes furthered EC Directive 89/48 that provided a system for the recognition of professional qualifications, in order to help make labour markets more standardised and transferable across EU nations, further liberalise the provision of services, encourage more automatic recognition of qualifications and simplify administrative procedures.

In June 2016 the society launched the Plant Health Professional Register, which was developed in conjunction with Nicola Spence, chief plant health office at Defra and Charles Lane of Fera Science. The register provides an opportunity for those working in plant health to have their profession recognised, and to be able to continue their professional development.

Competitions
The Society runs two competitions for schools, the British Biology Olympiad and Biology Challenge, which are designed to challenge Britain's most talented students and reward them for their success. The four winners of the British Biology Olympiad go forward to compete in the International Biology Olympiad.

Biology Week
The society has organised an annual Biology Week since 2012. It takes place in October and aims to inspire people of all ages and backgrounds with biology. It involves a series of events for scientists, schools, and members of the public.

Surveys

The society runs citizen science projects with the University of Gloucestershire.

Since 2012 it has been collecting records of flying ants as part of the Flying Ant Survey with Adam Hart. In 2013, it launched a House Spider Survey, also with Hart, to collect reports of sightings of Tegenaria spiders using an app.

In 2014 the society launched the Starling Murmuration Survey to study why starlings murmurate and thus inform research into why this species is in decline.

The Biologist

The Biologist is a bimonthly British professional magazine published by the society. The magazine was initially established by one of the two predecessor bodies, the Institute of Biology, in 1953. It is edited by the science journalist Tom Ireland. The magazine is abstracted and indexed in several EBSCO databases, including full-text access through Academic Search Complete.

See also
 Glossary of biology
 List of biologists
 Outline of biology

References

External links 
 
 The Biologist

British biology societies
Biologists

Learned societies of the United Kingdom
Organisations based in the London Borough of Camden
Scientific organisations based in the United Kingdom
Scientific organizations established in 2009
2009 establishments in the United Kingdom